William Samuel Jones (28 May 1920 – 15 November 2007), generally known as W. S. Jones or Wil Sam, was a Welsh-language author, playwright and scriptwriter.

Life
Jones was born in Llanystumdwy, and lived in the Eifionydd region in north Wales for his entire life. He worked as a mechanic before opening his own garage in the village of Llanystumdwy. He registered as a conscientious objector during the Second World War, working in food distribution.

He began writing as a young man and, from 1963 onwards, wrote plays to be performed at the Theatr y Gegin in Criccieth, Gwynedd. In the mid-1970s Jones began writing for television and radio and later becoming a full-time writer writing for television and national newspapers as well as for the stage.

Jones was known for the use of comedy and dialect in his work. Many of his plays contained elements of absurdity and symbolism, leading critics to make connections with the works of Beckett, N. F. Simpson and Ionesco. His most famous character, Ifas y Tryc ('Evans the Truck'), was played by Stewart Jones, a Bafta-Cymru winning actor.

Among his most famous works are his plays, Dinas Barhaus ("Abiding City") (1969), Bobi a Sami ("Bobi and Sami") and Y Sul Hwnnw ("That Sunday") (1981). Other writings include his lecture on the state of Welsh theatre, Y Toblaron ("The Toblarone") (1975), a selection of stories, Dyn y Mwnci ("The Monkey Man") (1979) and a selection of his comic verse, Rhigymau Wil Sam ("The Rhymes of Wil Sam") (2005).

Jones's last work was a Welsh translation and adaptation of The Weir by Conor McPherson which was performed by Cardiff-based company Sherman Cymru in 2009.

Works
 Tair Drama Fer (1962)
 Pum Drama Fer (1963)
 Tŷ Clap (1965)
 Dau Frawd (1965)
 Y Fain (1967)
 Dinas Barhaus: a thair drama arall (1968)
 Mae Rhywbeth Bach (1969)
 Y Toblarôn (1975)
 Dyn y Mwnci (1979)
 Mewn Tri Chyfrwng (1979)
 Y Sul Hwnnw (1981)
 Ifas y tryc (1983)
 Ifas eto fyth! (1987)
 Deg drama Wil Sam (1995)
 Llifeiriau (1997)
 Ifas Eto Fyth (2000)
 Rhigymau Wil Sam (2005)
 Newyddion Ffoltia Mawr (2005)
 Mân bethau hwylus: cymeriadau Eifionydd (2005)

References

Sources
W. S. Jones Wil Sam, ed. Gwenno Hywyn (Cyfres y Cewri 5) (Caernarfon:Gwasg Gwynedd, 1985)
Obituary, The Independent, 20 November 2007 
Obituary, BBC News, 16 November 2007 (Welsh language)
BBC News, 26 July 2011 
Planet Magazine, May 2009

1920 births
2007 deaths
Welsh conscientious objectors
Welsh writers
Welsh-language writers
20th-century Welsh dramatists and playwrights